Pierino may refer to:

 Pierino (given name), Italian given name
 Pierino colpisce ancora, a 1982 comedy film directed by Marino Girolami
 Pierino contro tutti, a 1981 comedy film directed by Marino Girolami
 Pierino medico della Saub, a 1981 Italian comedy film directed by Giuliano Carnimeo
 Pierino, italian version of Little Johnny

See also 

 Perino (disambiguation)
 Pierini (disambiguation)
 Piero (disambiguation)
 Pierrot (disambiguation)